Glacé can mean

 Candied fruit, alternately glacé fruit
 Roze koek, of which glacé or glace is a registered brand name in some countries
 The Frozen Dead (TV series), 2017 French TV series and its source novel, both also known as Glacé